This is a list of recipients of the Governor General's Award for French-to-English translation.

Winners and nominees

1980s

1990s

2000s

2010s

2020s

References 

Translation awards
Awards established in 1987
1987 establishments in Canada
Translation